Toledo Bend Reservoir is a reservoir on the Sabine River between Texas and Louisiana. The lake has an area of 185,000 acres (749 km2), the largest man-made body of water partially in both Louisiana and Texas, the largest in the South, and the fifth largest by surface acre in the United States. The dam is capable of generating 92 megawatts of electrical power. The dam itself is located in the northeast corner of Newton County, Texas; however, that county includes very little of the reservoir, as most of it extends northward into parts of Sabine and DeSoto parishes in Louisiana, and Sabine, Shelby, and Panola counties in Texas.

Historical development
The land along the Orange area often flooded from the Sabine, with destructive effects. Also, the considerations for municipal, industrial, agricultural, and recreational purposes were part of the reasons the Texas State Legislature formed the Sabine River Authority of Texas" (SRA-T) in 1949, and in 1950 the Louisiana State Legislature created the Sabine River Authority,  State of Louisiana (SRA-L) for the project.

The two autonomous entities formed the Sabine River Compact, a memorandum of agreement, approved by the Legislatures of the States of Texas (1953) and Louisiana (1954), The U.S. Congress, and the President. These organizations and the compact were a result of efforts that began with the Sabine River Watershed Association of Texas after World War II as well as citizens from Louisiana, to create a freshwater supply, that included hydroelectric power, as well as providing recreation.

With both authorities in agreement, in 1955 a feasibility report was initiated and by 1959, the two states allocated 30 million dollars for the project. The land was acquired in 1963, with the work following the subsequent year. The dam was built by the two states, without any assistance from the federal government.

History
Beginning in May 1963, land acquisitions for Toledo Bend Reservoir started as a joint management project of Texas and Louisiana River Authorities. Construction on the Toledo Bend Dam, spillway, and power plant, began on May 11, 1964. The closure section of the earthen embankment and impoundment of water was begun in October 1966. The power plant was completed and began operating in the early part of 1969. The Toledo Bend Project was constructed primarily for the purposes of water supply, hydroelectric power generation, and recreation.

Toledo Bend Reservoir forms a portion of the boundary between the states of Texas and Louisiana.

Area impact
Many communities were affected in the impacted parishes and counties.

Sabine Parish
In Sabine Parish there were several communities that included houses and other buildings such as schools and churches predominantly poor and minority, that were inundated.
Pine Flat Community (100 individuals and included about 50 homes and a school),
Barlake community, 
Richard Neck community,
Kites Landing

Toledo Bend is the nation's only public water conservation and hydroelectric power project to be undertaken without federal participation in its permanent financing.

Public recreation
Toledo Bend, with its  of shoreline, offers a large variety of recreational activities and is a major element in serving the growing demand for water oriented outdoor recreation. Both private and public facilities are available for swimming, boating, picnicking, fishing, camping, hunting, and sightseeing. The reservoir is a popular location for freshwater fishing with many clubs hosting tournaments.

At present, the lake is best suited to shallow draft power boats due to a large number of trees and stumps that are still in the body of the lake. Although there are numerous well marked boat lanes that have been cleared of stumps and trees, one should use caution even on the boat lanes; one should use extreme caution when off the boat lanes and maintain a watch for stumps and/or trees as well as floating logs.

See also

Lawrence T. Fuglaar, former member of the Louisiana House of Representatives and 1972 drowning victim on the lake
Conway LeBleu, represented Calcasieu and Cameron parishes in the Louisiana House from 1964 to 1988 and was member of the Sabine River Authority
Texas Oilman's Bass Invitational

References

External links 
ToledoBendLake.com - The largest and oldest Toledo Bend Lake information site
ToledoBendLakeCountry.com -- Official site of the Toledo Bend (Sabine Parish) Tourist Commission
Toledo-Bend.Com -- Comprehensive info on Toledo Bend Lake and surrounding areas of Texas and Louisiana
ToledoBend.Com -- Complete source of information on Toledo Bend Lake

Bodies of water of DeSoto Parish, Louisiana
Bodies of water of Sabine Parish, Louisiana
Bodies of water of Panola County, Texas
Protected areas of Panola County, Texas
Bodies of water of Newton County, Texas
Bodies of water of Sabine County, Texas
Bodies of water of Shelby County, Texas
Dams in Louisiana
Dams in Texas
Reservoirs in Louisiana
Reservoirs in Texas
United States state-owned dams